William Corbin (McGraw) (born January 22, 1916 in Des Moines, Iowa, died  June 6, 1999 in Portland, Oregon) was an author and novelist of books for adults and children.

Career 
He started his writing career as a newspaperman and later married Eloise Jarvis McGraw, also an author.
Corbin became more serious about writing fiction and moved into a house with a 23-acre filbert orchard to do so. Several of Corbin's works received awards. His novel Smoke was made into a movie of the same name in 1970, and a British television series based on Corbin's Horse in the House was produced from 1977 to 1979.

Personal life 
William Corbin had two children, Lauren and Peter McGraw.

Works 

 Deadline (1952)
 Horse in House (1964)
 Smoke (1967)
 The Everywhere Cat (1970)
 The Day Willie Wasn't (1971) 
 The Prettiest Gargoyle (1971)
 The Pup with the Up and Down Tail (1972) 
 Golden Mare
 High Road Home
 A Dog Worth Stealing
 Pony for Keeps
 Me and the End of the World

References

External links 
 

1916 births
1999 deaths
Writers from Des Moines, Iowa
Writers from Portland, Oregon